Yaranina is a rural locality (a village) in Cherdynsky District, Perm Krai, Russia. The population was 6 as of 2010. There is 1 street.

Geography 
Yaranina is located 119 km southwest of Cherdyn (the district's administrative centre) by road. Koepty is the nearest rural locality.

References 

Rural localities in Cherdynsky District